Collonia is a genus of small sea snails with calcareous opercula, marine gastropod mollusks in the family Colloniidae.

Species
Species within the genus Collonia include:
 Collonia admissa (E. A. Smith, 1890)
 Collonia donghaiensis Dong, 1982
 Collonia granulosa Pease, 1868
 Collonia incerta (E. A. Smith, 1890)

The following species were brought into synonymy
 Collonia gestroi Caramagna, 1888: synonym of Yaronia gestroi (Caramagna, 1888)
 Collonia maculosa Pease, 1868: synonym of Homalopoma maculosa (Pease, 1868)
 Collonia munda H. Adams, 1873: synonym of Bothropoma mundum (H. Adams, 1873)
 Collonia purpurescens Dunker, 1882: synonym of Homalopoma amussitatum (Gould, 1861)
 Collonia quantilla Gould, 1861: synonym of Homalopoma quantillum (Gould, 1861)
 Collonia rosa Pilsbry, 1904: synonym of Neocollonia pilula rosa (Pilsbry, 1904)

References

External links
 To GenBank 
 To World Register of Marine Species

Colloniidae
Taxa named by John Edward Gray